Emily Elissa Randall (born 1985) is an American politician and activist who is a member of the Washington State Senate from the 26th district. A member of the Democratic Party, she was elected in 2018.

Early life and education 
Randall was born and raised on the Kitsap Peninsula. She graduated from Wellesley College with a Bachelor of Arts degree in Spanish and women's studies. Her sister, Olivia, was born with severe developmental and physical disabilities.

Career 
Alongside Senator Claire Wilson, she is one of the first two openly-LGBTQ women to serve in the Washington State Senate.

Prior to serving in the Senate, Randall worked as a community organizer, where she focused on issues related to public education and healthcare.

As Senator, Randall has focused on increasing access to better behavioral and reproductive health, affordable housing, and public safety. She serves as whip for the state Senate majority. In March 2022, Randall sponsored a bill to lower the toll to cross the Tacoma Narrows Bridge by 75 cents. The bill was passed and took effect on October of the same year.

She serves in the Senate’s Higher Education committee, Workforce Development Committee and on the Health and Long Term Care and Transportation committee.

Election 
In 2018, Randall defeated Republican challenger Marty McClendon 35,087 to 34,983, a margin of 104 votes.

In 2022, Randall won re-election with around 51% of the votes cast.

References

1985 births
Living people
Democratic Party Washington (state) state senators
21st-century American politicians
21st-century American women politicians
Women state legislators in Washington (state)
LGBT state legislators in Washington (state)
Lesbian politicians
Wellesley College alumni